Micael Ferreira Galvão, commonly known as Mica Galvão, (born 8 October 2003) is a submission grappler, Luta Livre and Brazilian jiu-jitsu (BJJ) black belt competitor from the Brazilian state of Amazonas. A highly decorated athlete competing since childhood, often against older opponents, Galvão was promoted to black belt in 2021, at the record age of 17, less than 3 years after reaching blue belt. A year later, Galvão won the 2022 IBJJF World Jiu-Jitsu Championship, becoming the youngest ever black belt Brazilian jiu-jitsu world champion.

Early life 
Micael Ferreira Galvão was born on 8 October 2003 in Manaus, Brazil. His father Melquisedeque Galvão, known as Melqui Galvão, was the chief investigator of the special anti-kidnapping squad of the Manaus Police Department, and a Brazilian jiu-jitsu (BJJ) and Luta Livre black belt. Galvão's grandfather was a well known kung fu instructor. Coached by his father, Galvão first BJJ competition took place at the age of 4. In February 2011 his father started Projeto Nandinho a program for low-income children and adolescents, looking to train in BJJ, the academy was at first located in his garage, later becoming part of Dream Art project, another program for young athletes supported by Alliance Jiu Jitsu in the region of Amazonas.

Together with his sister Sammi, the siblings quickly conquered all the main competitions in the Amazonas and Brazil. At the 2015 Amazonian Jiu-Jitsu Championship, 11-year-old Galvão submitted all his opponents winning an Amazon Championship title the for 15th time. In July 2015 Galvão and his sister left the country for the first time, to participate in the American National Jiu-Jitsu Championship taking place in Las Vegas.

The Galvão siblings became known around the regional competition circuit for submitting older and heavier opponents during "superfights". In one of those matches, 13-year-old green belt Galvão submitted a 25-year-old brown belt with proven competition record. At 15 Galvão was promoted to blue belt, winning the 2017 IBJJF Kids Pan; a month later, during a tournament known as Copa Podio Orange League Event where juveniles faced experience grapplers, Galvão submitted Leandro Rounaud, a former IBJJF Manaus Open adult black belt champion. In January Galvão won the IBJJF European Jiu-Jitsu Championship taking place in Portugal, in the Juvenile, blue heavy division. In August 2019 Galvão won the Abu Dhabi International Pro Championship, taking place in Manaus, in the - juvenile blue belt division while his sister Sammi won the - female adult purple belt.

After turning sixteen Galvão was promoted to purple belt, competing in the adult bracket he won the Abu Dhabi Grand Slam 2019–2020 – Abu Dhabi then less than a year later was promoted to brown belt in October 2020. In April 2021 he won the Abu Dhabi Grand Slam 2020–2021 – Abu Dhabi in the - division.  In May 2021 Galvão participated in Flograppling's Who's Number 1 (WNO), defeating World No-Gi black belt Champion and ADCC veteran Dante Leon by unanimous decision. In June 2021 it was announced that Roberto “Cyborg” Abreu’s Fight Sports  was partnering with Melqui Galvao's project in Brazil providing an exchange program between their HQ in Miami and their location in Manaus. Galvão announced that he was now representing Fight Sports team going forward in competitions. That same year, as a Brown Belt, Galvão won the Abu Dhabi Grand Slam World Pro and the 2021 IBJJF No Gi Pan Championship in the middleweight division.

On June 19, 2021 Galvão entered the Third Coast Grappling 7 grand prix, submitting three BJJ black belts in one night to win the title.

Black belt career

2021
On 9 July 2021 a few months after being promoted to black belt in Luta Livre by his mentor Totonho Aleixo, and only 9 months after receiving his BJJ brown belt, 17-years old Galvão was promoted to BJJ black belt by his father Melqui Galvão at their academy. Galvão became the youngest BJJ black belt in the history of Brazilian jiu-jitsu. In October he won the Abu Dhabi Grand Slam 2021–2022 Rio De Janeiro, winning all his fights by submission. In November 2021, Galvão became the youngest athlete to compete in the AJP World Pro championship at the male black belt level, then became the youngest competitor to win the event after submitting all his opponents in the  division.

After defeating Carlos Andrade at the prestigious Curitiba Open, a tournament featuring the top Brazilian competitors, Galvão held a record of 12 submission win in a row. In September 2021 Galvão lost a no-Gi match to Tye Ruotolo by Split Decision at the WNO Championship.

2022
In February 2022 Galvão won the Brazilian ADCC Trials submitting all of his opponents, scoring 6 wins, 5 submissions and 1 disqualification, and securing a spot at the upcoming 2022 ADCC Submission Fighting World Championship, the world's biggest grappling tournament, in the 77 kg weight class.

In April 2022, Galvão took part in BJJ Stars 8 Middleweight GP, one of the biggest and most prestigious professional jiu-jitsu shows taking place in São Paulo; Galvão won the first match against multiple-time black belt World champion Leandro Lo via decision, the semi-final against Mauricio Oliveira via submission (Injury Forfeit) then won the final against Lucas "Hulk" Barbosa, a-two time World champion (Gi and No-Gi) whom Galvão defeated with a Bow and Arrow Choke.

In June 2022 competing at the World Championship as a black belt for the first time, Galvão became, at 18 years old, the youngest ever jiu-jitsu world champion after defeating 19-year-old Tye Ruotolo in the lightweight final. Galvão won silver at the 2022 ADCC World Championship after defeating Dante Leon, Renato Canuto and Oliver Taza by points but losing to Kade Ruotolo in the final.

2023
In January 2023, Galvão's father Melqui announced that they would be separating from Fight Sports and branching out as their own BJJ affiliation, including a new location in São Paulo. He returned to gi competition for the first time in 9 months at the Abu Dhabi Grand Slam Tour in London on March 12, 2023, winning gold in the welterweight division.

Brazilian Jiu-Jitsu competitive summary 
Main Achievements (Black belt):

 IBJJF World Champion (2022)
 CBJJ Brazilian Nationals Champion (2022)
 BJJ Stars Middleweight Grand Prix Champion (2022)
 Third Coast Grappling Middleweight Grand Prix Champion (2021)
 ADCC Balneário Brazil Trials Champion (2021)
 AJP Abu Dhabi World Pro Champion (2021)
 AJP Grand Slam, RJ Champion (2021)
 2nd Place ADCC Submission Fighting World Championship (2022)
 2nd Place WNO Championship (2021)

Main Achievements (Coloured Belts):

 IBJJF Pan No-Gi Champion (2021 brown)
 AJP World Pro Champion (2021 brown)
 AJP World Pro Qualifier BR winner (2021 brown)
 AJP Grand Slam, AD Champion (2020 purple, 2021 brown)
 2nd Place WNO Championship (2021)

Main Achievements (Juvenile):
 IBJJF World Championship Juvenile Champion (2019)
 IBJJF Pan Championship Juvenile Champion (2019)
 IBJJF European Open Juvenile Champion (2019)
 IBJJF South American Championship Juvenile Champion (2019)
 CBJJ Brazilian Nationals Juvenile Champion (2019)
 CBJJ Brazilian Nationals Junior Champion (2015)
 BJJ Brazilian Nationals Teen Champion (2016)

Instructor lineage 
Carlos Gracie → Helio Gracie → Royler Gracie → Augusto Monteiro → Ronnie Melo → Melquisedeque Galvão → Micael Galvão

Personal life 
Galvão has stated that his concern for animal welfare has made him a vegetarian, and that his diet plan has benefited his athletic performance.

He is in a relationship with Amit Elor, the youngest American to ever win a senior title at the Freestyle Wrestling World Championships.

Notes

References 

Living people
2003 births
Brazilian practitioners of Brazilian jiu-jitsu
People awarded a black belt in Brazilian jiu-jitsu
World Brazilian Jiu-Jitsu Championship medalists
Sportspeople from Amazonas (Brazilian state)
People awarded a black belt in Luta Livre
People from Manaus
Brazilian submission wrestlers